Bastarda (or bastard) was a blackletter script used in France, the Burgundian Netherlands and Germany during the 14th and 15th centuries. The Burgundian variant of script can be seen as the court script of the Dukes of Burgundy.

The early printers produced regional versions in type which were used especially to print texts in the vernacular languages, more rarely for Latin texts. The earliest bastarda type was produced by the German Gutenberg in 1454–55. The main variety was the one used in France, which was also found in Geneva, Antwerp and London.  Another local variety was found in the Netherlands; Caxton's first types were a rather poor copy of this. The French  passed out of use by the mid-16th century, but the German variety developed into the national  type, which remained in use until the mid-twentieth century.

British typeface designer Jonathan Barnbrook has designed a contemporary interpretation titled Bastard.

See also

Asemic writing
Blackletter
Book hand
Calligraphy
Chancery hand
Court hand (also known as common law hand, Anglicana, cursiva antiquior, or charter hand)
Cursive
Hand (writing style)
Handwriting
History of writing
Italic script
Law hand
Palaeography
Penmanship
Ronde script (calligraphy)
Rotunda (script)
Round hand
Secretary hand

References

External links
 Fonts for Latin Palaeography, A comprehensive PDF file containing 77 pages profusely illustrated.

Typography
Western calligraphy
Blackletter